HNLMS Isaac Sweers was one of four  built for the Royal Netherlands Navy during World War II.

Design and construction
The keel was laid on 26 November 1938. The ship was launched on 16 March 1940 and the unfinished ship was evacuated to England after the German invasion of the Netherlands. She was completed in Great Britain, with six British 4-inch dual purpose guns instead of planned five 120 mm guns. The ship was modern for her time, she was fast and had two manually stabilized 40 mm Bofors AA-guns, each with its own "Hazemeyer" fire control, an on-mount mechanical analog fire control computer integrated with a on-mount optical rangefinder. It was the first Dutch ship to use radar to aim its AA-guns. The ship's plans were saved from the Germans and elements were incorporated into Royal Navy ship designs.

Operations 
She escorted the important convoy MW 8B to Malta in January 1942. During this mission the British destroyer  was torpedoed by the German submarine  on 12 January 1942. Isaac Sweers towed the stricken British destroyer through a field of burning oil and saved her entire crew of 240 sailors. They were taken to Tobruk.

On 13 November 1942, Isaac Sweers was hit by two torpedoes from the German submarine  under command of Wilhelm Dommes. She sank with the loss of 108 of her 194 crew.

Notes

References

External links 
 Dutch navy destroyers in WWII
 Dutch radar developments 1936-1941

Gerard Callenburgh-class destroyers
Ships built in Vlissingen
Ships built in Southampton
1940 ships
World War II destroyers of the Netherlands
Ships sunk by German submarines in World War II
World War II shipwrecks in the Mediterranean Sea
Maritime incidents in November 1942